Francis Boott (June 24, 1813 in Boston, Massachusetts – March 1, 1904 in Cambridge, Massachusetts) was an American classical music composer of art songs and works for chorus.

Biography
Boott was born of British parentage. He was educated at Samuel and Sarah Ripley's school in Waltham, where Ralph Waldo Emerson was one of the tutors, and at Round Hill School, followed by Harvard College from which he graduated in 1831. In the 1850s, following the death of his wife, Boott took his young daughter Elizabeth (Lizzie) (1846–88) to Florence, Italy, where he studied harmony with Luigi Picchianti.

Boott became an honorary professor at the Academy of Fine Arts.  He was friends with others in the Anglophone community in Florence, including Henry and William James, the Brownings, Isa Blagden and Constance Fenimore Woolson. Francis Boott and his daughter Lizzie Boott lived at the Villa Castellani in the Bellosguardo heights. Lizzie became a painter, and married the painter Frank Duveneck, who went to live with her and her father in the villa. The novelist Henry James visited them there and used the villa as a model for Italian villas in his Roderick Hudson and The Portrait of a Lady.

In 1888 Boott returned to America, and continued to compose music.

He died on 1 March 1904 at the age of 90 in Cambridge, Massachusetts.

Boott bequeathed $10,000 to Harvard University as a prize fund for the best 4-part vocal work written by a Harvard student.  In 1960 the amount was increased to $15,246 through capital gains. The prize continues to be awarded by the Harvard University Department of Music.

Music

Boott's first six songs appeared in 1846 under the pen name of Telford; Upton described them as "quite undistinguished". In 1857 eight songs were published, followed by many individual songs in the following years. Boott composed at least 140 songs during his long life, as well as a handful of duets, choral works, part-songs, and instrumental works.  He also composed hymns for church services, many of which were included in the hymnal for King's Chapel in Boston.

While his melodies and piano accompaniments are considered "commonplace, with little harmonic interest", his choices of texts were sophisticated, embracing the literary world of his time.  In 1857 John Sullivan Dwight wrote that his songs are "not strikingly original, but graceful and facile, much to be preferred to the popular sweetish, sentimental type".

Musical compositions
Songs for voice and piano
 under the pseudonym Telford:
Six Songs, 1846, G. P. Reed Publishing
The Convict's Lullaby (Henry Kirke White); revised 1874, S. Brainard's Sons, publisher
It is O'er (Mrs. Jameson)
Lass of Northmaven (from The Pirate)
Byron's Farewell (Lord Byron)
Tirana Española; revised 1874, S. Brainard's Sons, publisher
My Home and Thee
The Blind Man's Bride (Ballad) (Caroline Sheridan Norton), G. P. Reed, 1846; revised 1874, S. Brainard's Sons, publisher
Cleveland's Farewell (Sir Walter Scott), G. P. Reed, 1846
 
 under his own name
Florence, 8 songs, Oliver Ditson, 1857
Sands o' Dee (Charles Kingsley)
Stars of the Summer Night (Henry Wadsworth Longfellow)
The Night is Clear and Cloudless (Henry Wadsworth Longfellow)
Ring Out Wild Bells (Alfred Lord Tennyson)
Break, Break, Break, at the Foot of Thy Stones, O Sea (Alfred Lord Tennyson)
From the Close-shut Window (Lowell)
Battle of the Baltic (Campbell)
I am Weary with Rowing (William Wetmore Story)

Six Songs (Bret Harte), Oliver Ditson, 1870
The Heathen Chinee
Chiquita
Twenty years
Jim
Flynn of Virginia
Upon the Stanislow

Our Young Folks: Six Little Songs, G. D. Russell publisher, 1870
(Unknown song)
The Rivulet (Lucy Larcom)
Lady Moon (Lord Houghton/Richard Monckton Milnes)
Little Nanny (Lucy Larcom)
Swing Away (Lucy Larcom)
Berrying Song (Lucy Larcom)

Three Songs, G. D. Russell publisher, 1870
Violet (Colonel John Hay), 1825
We Two (Jean Ingelow), 1840
The Lighthouse-keeper's Child (Thomas Hood), 1849

Two Barcaroles (Luigi Catani), Ditson
The Honeymoon, 1884
A Year After, 1886

 other single songs, all published by Oliver Ditson unless noted
Aftermath (Henry Wadsworth Longfellow), 1873
Ah! When the Fight is Won (Recitative and Air) (from Lowell's R.G.S. Memoriae Positum), 1892 
A Letter (Frederick Locker-Lampson), 1876
Anacreontic (as sung by Mrs. Wilson Eyre) (Leigh Hunt), 1876
The Angelus (Frances L. Mace), 1883
At the Garden Gate (Frank Dempster Sherman), 1891
Ave Maria, 1873
After Absence (Lilla Cabot Perry), 1893
Aftermath (Henry Wadsworth Longfellow)
Baby's Shoes (Julia Ward Howe),  W. H. Boner & Co., 1870
Battle of the Baltic (unknown author), 1857
The Bell Buoy (Rudyard Kipling), 1901
Bells on the Wind (Mrs. F. M. Ritter), 1880s
Beyond the Smiling and the Weeping (with optional mixed quartet) (Horatius Bonar), 1876
The Black Friar (unknown author), 1858
The Bobolink (G. P. Lathrop), 1877
Bring Me No Cup (On a Motif from Lethe) (unknown author), 1891
Bring the Bowl which you Boast (unknown author), 1858
Broken Rhythm: My Oars Keep Time (H. Trusta/Elizabeth Stuart Phelps), 1850s, reissued 1876
Castibelza (after Victor Hugo), 1885
Changed (from Longfellow's Aftermath), 1873
Coming (words from Marigold Leaves) (unknown author), 1875
The Confession (Praed), 1873
The Cumberland (Henry Wadsworth Longfellow), 1863
The Destruction of the Assyrians (from Hebrew Melodies) (Lord Byron), 1888
Dormi, Jesu! The Virgin's Cradle-hymn (Samuel Taylor Coleridge), 1859
Douglas, Tender and True (Miss Mulock), 1884
Echoes (Christopher Pearse Cranch), 1877
Egyptian Serenade (George William Curtis), 1887
The First Cricket (William Dean Howells), 1876
The Fisherman's Song (Rose Terry Cooke), 1870
Flow On, Sad Stream (William Wetmore Story), 1876
Garden of Roses (William Wetmore Story), 1863
Gipsies Song (unknown author), 1857
Goodbye (Samuel G. Goodrich), 1858
Guild the Engineer (Ballad) (unknown author), 1873
Heigh-Ho! (Christopher Pearse Cranch), William A. Pond & Co. publisher, 1870
Here's a health to King Charles (William Makepeace Thackeray), 1867
Home (Last Words in a Strange Land) (James Thomas Fields), 1880
How to Put the Question (Mrs. Caroline Spencer), S. Brainard's Sons publisher, 1870
If You Love Me (L. Clark), 1890
I know not if Moonlight (unknown author), 1883
In Memory of Oliver Wendell Holmes (Samuel Francis Smith), C.W. Thompson & Co. publisher, 1899
In the Cathedral (Katherine Saunders), Arthur P. Schmidt publisher, 1881
In the Summer Even (from Rohan's Ghost" by Harriet Elizabeth Prescott Spofford), 1876
Into my Heart a Silent Look (Edward Bulwer-Lytton), 1885
Jenny Kissed Me (Leigh Hunt)
King Macbeth (song for baritone) (Edward Robert Bulwer Lytton/Owen Merideth), 1870
Kyrie Eleison (Henry Wadsworth Longfellow), 1857
Laus Deo (with chorus ad lib) (John Greenleaf Whittier), 1868
Leoni John Ruskin, C.W. Thompson & Co. publisher, 1900
Lethe (with optional 'cello or violin) (M.A. Barr), 1888, reissued 1911
My Life is like the Summer-Rose (unknown author), 1873
Love Song (Robert Burns Wilson), 1888
The Mahogany Tree (unknown author), 1858
Maria Mater (from Memento Rerum Conditor)
Master Love (Collin Rae-Brown), 1876
Memories Come O'er Me (William Wetmore Story), Lee & Walker publisher, 1876
Metempsychosis (J.B., from the London World), 1890
New Year's Bells (Alfred Tennyson), 1881
The Night Has a Thousand Eyes (Francis William Bourdillon), 1874
The Nightingale (Lust'ge Vögel in dem Wald), 1889
Non Partir (And wilt thou go) (A. Casini; English version by Christopher Pearse Cranch), 1869
Nora Macarty (Thomas Bailey Aldrich), 1878
Notturno (Roman Serenade) (unknown author), White-Smith publisher
No More (Friedrich Rückert), 1873
O Domine Deus (O Lord my God) (prayer of Mary, Queen of Scots), Prüfer publisher, 1874
O Light at my Window (Christopher Pearse Cranch), William A. Pond & Co. publisher, 1870
O Long and Lagging Hours of Time (Harriet Elizabeth Prescott Spofford), in Harper's Magazine, 1885
The Old Clock on the Stairs (with optional chorus)  (Henry Wadsworth Longfellow, 1886
O Well for the Fisherman's Boy (or Break, Break) (unknown author), 1857
Poor lone Hannah: As sung by Miss Adelaide Phillips (Lucy Larcom), 1869
Regrets (C. S. T.), 1876
Rose Aylmer (Walter Savage Landor), 1875
The Rose upon the Balcony (William Makepeace Thackeray), 1866
The Sailor's Wife (Charles Mackay), 1864
The Sea Has Its Pearls (Das Meer hat seine Perlen) (after Heinrich Heine), 1862
Serenade (Frederick Locker-Lampson), 1869
Sixty and Six (Thomas Wentworth Higginson), 1890
A Song of Long Ago (G. P. Lathrop), 1887
The Song of the Sea (William Dean Howells), 1872
Song of the Stromkerl (unknown author), 1868
A Spanish Cradle Song (unknown author), 1893
Spring Song (A Bird Sings Sweet and Strong) (George W. Curtis), 1866
The Stormy Petrel (Samuel G. Goodrich), 1876
Strike Me a Note (Thomas William Parsons), 1891
Sunset in Venice (Barcarole with English and Italian words) (Attilio Sarfatti), J. E. Ditson & Co., 1887
The Sunset Light (Barcarole) (Mary L. Ritter), Arthur P. Schmidt publishing, 1884
The Swallows (Gustavo Adolfo Bécquer), 1884
That Joyous Strain (Christopher Pearse Cranch), 1887
Thou and I (Words Address to her Sister) (Phoebe Cary), 1875
Thou dost not Remember the Hour (Ballad) (unknown author), S. Brainard's Sons publisher, 1874
Three Fishers (unknown author), 1868
Three Friends of Mine (Sonnet) (Henry Wadsworth Longfellow), 1882
Through the Long Days" (Col. John Hay), 1878
A Toast (George Santayana), C.W. Thompson & Co. publisher, 1893
Twenty Years Ago (William Wetmore Story), 1882
Vanished Time (William Wetmore Story), 1877
Waiting for the Bugle (Thomas Wentworth Higginson), 1889
Waiting for you Jock (Mrs. Moulton's Concert Song) (from Blackwood's Magazine), 1874
We Shall Meet No More (unknown author), 1886
We Two are Bound Together (Wir beide sein verbunden), White-Smith publisher
When Sylvia Sings (Samuel P. Duffield), 1892
When the Boys Come Home (A Song of '65) (Col. John Hay), 1887
The Wind Exultant (Winifred Howells), 1888
Wishing (A Nursery Song), (William Allingham), 1859
Yon Faithful Star (Serenade) (unknown author), 1873

Vocal duets
The Brooklet (Henry Wadsworth Longfellow), 1874
The Clover-blossoms Kiss Her Feet (duet for mezzo-soprano and tenor or baritone) (Oscar Laighton), 1882
Father the Watches of the Night are O'er (duet for equal voices) (Mrs. Ellen Sturgis Hooper), 1889
In the Dark, in the Dew (song and duet) (Miss Prescott), 1875
Love (song or duet for mixed voices) (Mrs. J. T. Fields), 1891
The Rivulet (duet for mezzo-soprano and tenor or baritone) (Alfred Tennyson), 1882

Large worksMaria Mater, soloists, chorus and orchestraMass, soloists, chorus and orchestraMiserere, a cappella mixed chorus, Oliver Ditson, 1888The Song of Zechariah, cantataTe Deum (according to the liturgy of the Church of England), soloists, chorus and orchestra, 1884

Shorter choral works and part-songs
Ave Maria, women's voices and piano or organ, 1897
The Bells of San Blas (Longfellow), quartet for equal voices, 1882
Carmen tabernarium (Ad usum sodalium die anniversario XX : iterum impressum die anniversario XLV) (Walter Map), men's voices, published 1929
Good Lives on Earth (unknown author), canon for three voices, unpublished, c.1890
Here's a health to King Charles! (Sir Walter Scott), tenor solo and men's chorus, 1867; mixed voices, Ditson, published 1909
Lead Kindly Light (Rev. Newman), quartet for mixed voices, 1884
My Harp Has One Unchanging Theme (Deh Senti il Rio), trio for soprano, tenor, and bass, 1893 
A National Anthem (Christopher Pearse Cranch), mixed voices, Ditson, 1881
Union and Liberty: National Anthem, (Oliver Wendell Holmes), mixed voices and piano, Ditson, 1894
Vestis Angelica (Thomas Wentworth Higginson), quartet for mixed voices, 1890

Instrumental works
String quartets

References

BibliographyRecollections of Francis Boott: For His Grandson, F.B.D.'' (Boston, 1912)

1813 births
1904 deaths
American male classical composers
American classical composers
Musicians from Boston
American people of British descent
Harvard College alumni
American expatriates in Italy
Classical musicians from Massachusetts
19th-century American male musicians